The 1937 Wisconsin Badgers football team was an American football team that represented the University of Wisconsin in the 1937 Big Ten Conference football season. The team compiled a 4–3–1 record (2–2–1 against conference opponents) and finished in a tie for sixth place in the Big Ten Conference. Harry Stuhldreher was in his second year as Wisconsin's head coach.

Fullback Howard Weiss was selected as the team's most valuable player. End Fred Benz was the team captain. Benz and halfback Bill Schmitz were selected as second-team All-Big Ten players by the Associated Press and United Press, respectively.

The team played its home games at Camp Randall Stadium, which had a capacity of 36,000. During the 1937 season, the average attendance at home games was 24,121.

Schedule

References

Wisconsin
Wisconsin Badgers football seasons
Wisconsin Badgers football